Mycetocola reblochoni is a Gram-positive, aerobic, non-spore-forming and rod-shaped bacterium from the genus Mycetocola which has been isolated from the surface of Reblochon cheese.

References

Microbacteriaceae
Bacteria described in 2008